The Third Department or third department may refer to:

 Third Section of His Imperial Majesty's Own Chancellery, a secret investigatory department in Imperial Russia
 Third Department of the New York Supreme Court, Appellate Division
 Third Department of the People's Liberation Army of China